Joni Wiman (born October 9, 1993) is a rallycross driver from Finland.  Wiman won the 2014 Global RallyCross Championship.  In 2013 he won the Global RallyCross lites championship.  Wiman won gold at the X Games Los Angeles 2013 in Rallycross Lites.  After the 2016 Global RallyCross Championship, in 2017, Wiman competed in the Nordic RX Academy on Ice.

Racing record

Career summary

Complete FIA European Rallycross Championship results
(key)

Super1600

Complete Global RallyCross Championship results
(key)

GRC Lites

Supercar

Complete FIA World Rallycross Championship results
(key)

Supercar

References

External links

1993 births
Finnish rally drivers
Living people
World Rallycross Championship drivers
Global RallyCross Championship drivers
European Rallycross Championship drivers

X Games athletes
ADAC Formel Masters drivers
British Formula Renault 2.0 drivers
Formula Renault 2.0 NEC drivers
Formula Renault Eurocup drivers
Koiranen GP drivers
Eifelland Racing drivers
Fortec Motorsport drivers